The 2018 Four Nations Tournament is a football tournament for the national teams of Angola, South Africa, Zambia and Zimbabwe. It took place during the March 2018 window of the FIFA International Match Calendar.

A draw to determine the semi-final round matches was held on 12 March 2018.

Matches

Semi-finals

Third place play-off

Final

Goalscorers

2 goals

 Djalma
 Lebo Mothiba
 Talent Chawapiwa

1 goal

 Yano
 Percy Tau
 Lazarous Kambole
 Justin Shonga
 Brian Amidu

Own goals

 Isaac Shamujompa (Against Zimbabwe)

References 

International association football competitions hosted by Zambia
International men's association football invitational tournaments
2018 in African football
2018 in Zambian sport
March 2018 sports events in Africa
Ndola